Richard F. Proud (January 19, 1922 – January 24, 2009) was an American politician who served in the Nebraska Legislature from 1965 to 1975.

Early life 
Richard Proud was born in Des Moines, Iowa, on January 19, 1922. He moved to Arapahoe, Nebraska, where he graduated from high school. Proud graduated from the University of Nebraska–Lincoln before earning a degree from the University of Colorado Law School. He was a second lieutenant with the United States Navy and commanded a landing craft in the Pacific Theater of World War II.

Career 
After the war, Proud became a lawyer and lobbyist for Mutual of Omaha, where he worked for two decades. He was first elected to the Nebraska Legislature in November 1964, and continually reelected from Omaha in district 12 until choosing not to run during the 1974 election cycle. From 1973 to 1974, Proud was speaker of the state legislature. From 1972 to 1973, Proud led an effort to rescind Nebraska's ratification of the proposed Equal Rights Amendment, after legislative colleague Fern Hubbard Orme had backed the amendment's ratification. In the 1976 United States Senate election in Nebraska, Proud lost the Republican Party primary to John Y. McCollister.

After stepping down from the state legislature, Proud served the Nebraska Department of Welfare as deputy director and general counsel, as well as an assistant professor at the University of Nebraska–Lincoln. In retirement, Proud moved to Battlement Mesa, Colorado. He died in Rifle, Colorado, on January 24, 2009. A memorial was held in Battlement Mesa and Arapahoe, and Proud was interred in Arapahoe.

References

|-

1922 births
2009 deaths
20th-century American politicians
Republican Party Nebraska state senators
20th-century American lawyers
Nebraska lawyers
University of Nebraska–Lincoln faculty
University of Colorado Law School alumni
University of Nebraska–Lincoln alumni
United States Navy personnel of World War II
Speakers of the Nebraska Legislature
American lobbyists
People from Furnas County, Nebraska
Politicians from Des Moines, Iowa
Politicians from Omaha, Nebraska
People from Garfield County, Colorado